Aygabats is a village in the Akhuryan Municipality of the Shirak Province of Armenia. The Statistical Committee of Armenia reported its population was 766 in 2010, up from 757 at the 2001 census.

Demographics

References 

Communities in Shirak Province
Populated places in Shirak Province